The Chevrolet Series FB (or Chevrolet FB) is an American vehicle manufactured by GM's Chevrolet Division from 1919 to 1922. It was replaced by the 1923 Chevrolet Superior.

The FB was the largest model in the Chevrolet range at the time following the demise of the V8 Series D, and complemented the smaller Chevrolet Series 490.

In January of 1921 a General Motors management survey recommended that the Chevrolet Division be cancelled, but Alfred P. Sloan Jr. recommended that the division be saved and William S. Knudsen was made Vice President of Operations and performance improved.

Model names
The Series FB was advertised as the FB-12 and FB-20 (roadster), FB-22 and FB-30 (coupe), FB-40 and FB-42 (sedan) and FB-32 and FB-50 (touring).  The roadster was also sometimes known as the "Royal Mail" and the tourer as the "Baby Grand", but these names were officially dropped during 1919. 

During 1922 the model was sometimes referred to as the "Superior", which is the name given to the 1923 replacement.

Specification
Available in four body styles; two-door roadster and coupe and four-door tourer and sedan. The FB continued in production without many changes, the most significant in 1922 with a change to steel wheels in lieu of wood spoke ones, and larger 10gal fuel tank.

All model years were powered by the same  4-cylinder overhead valve engine, producing  @ 2000rpm, as used in the previous Series FA; this had been developed from the short-stroke  version with  used in the Series H before it.

References

Series FB
Cars introduced in 1919
1920s cars